Touched with Fire is a 2015 American drama film directed and written by Paul Dalio and starring Katie Holmes, Luke Kirby, Christine Lahti, Griffin Dunne and Bruce Altman. The film is about two bipolar poets who meet in a psychiatric hospital and fall in love. The film was released on February 12, 2016, by Roadside Attractions. It 'draws' on the book of the same name by Kay Redfield Jamison, and the book features in the plot.

Cast 
 Katie Holmes as Carla
 Luke Kirby as Marco
 Christine Lahti as Sara
 Griffin Dunne as George
 Bruce Altman as Donald
 Alex Manette as Eddy
 Edward Gelbinovich as Nick Quadri
 Daniel Gerroll as Dr. Lyon
 Genevieve Adams as Susan
 Rob Leo Roy as Gary

Production 
Filming began on April 10, 2013, in New York City.

Release
The film premiered at South by Southwest on March 15, 2015. Roadside Attractions acquired the US distribution rights to the film on May 19, 2015. The film was released on February 12, 2016, by Roadside Attractions.

Reception

Critical response
On review aggregator Rotten Tomatoes, the film has an approval rating of 67% based on 51 reviews, with an average rating of 6.06/10.

References

External links 
 
 
 

2015 films
Films about bipolar disorder
Films set in New York City
Films shot in New York City
40 Acres and a Mule Filmworks films
2015 romantic drama films
American romantic drama films
2015 directorial debut films
2010s English-language films
2010s American films